Extractors is a video game developed by Millennium Interactive and published by Psygnosis in 1995 for MS-DOS. It is the sequel to Diggers (1993).

Gameplay
Extractors is a science-fiction puzzle game in which three different races seek to overthrow the evil Quarriors.

Reception
Next Generation gave the game two stars out of five, and stated that "A couple of flaws keep Extractors from being as entertaining or addictive as the other puzzle games it imitates. It's extremely repetitive, and it suffers from an awkward interface - a real liability in a game like this. Only the patient need apply."

Reviews
PC Gamer Vol. 2 No. 7 (1995 July)
Amiga Computing #85 (Apr 1995)
Amiga Power #50 (1995 June)
The One #79
World Village (Gamer's Zone) (1995)
Power Play (Jul, 1995)

References

External links

1995 video games
DOS games
DOS-only games
Psygnosis games
Puzzle video games
Science fiction video games
Video games developed in the United Kingdom